PJ Phelan is the name of:
Paddy Phelan (cricketer)
Paul James Phelan, a Canadian yachtsman and restaurateur